Hamilton Glacier is the name of two glaciers in the Ross Dependency:
Hamilton Glacier (Shackleton Coast)
Hamilton Glacier (Edward VII Peninsula)